Events from the year 1915 in Canada.

Incumbents

Crown 
 Monarch – George V

Federal government 
 Governor General – Prince Arthur, Duke of Connaught and Strathearn 
 Prime Minister – Robert Borden
 Chief Justice – Charles Fitzpatrick (Quebec) 
 Parliament – 12th

Provincial governments

Lieutenant governors 
Lieutenant Governor of Alberta – George H. V. Bulyea (until October 20) then Robert Brett 
Lieutenant Governor of British Columbia – Francis Stillman Barnard 
Lieutenant Governor of Manitoba – Douglas Colin Cameron  
Lieutenant Governor of New Brunswick – Josiah Wood 
Lieutenant Governor of Nova Scotia – James Drummond McGregor (until October 19) then David MacKeen    
Lieutenant Governor of Ontario – John Strathearn Hendrie 
Lieutenant Governor of Prince Edward Island – Benjamin Rogers (until June 3) then Augustine Colin Macdonald 
Lieutenant Governor of Quebec – François Langelier (until February 8) then Pierre-Évariste Leblanc 
Lieutenant Governor of Saskatchewan – George W. Brown (until October 6) then Richard Stuart Lake

Premiers 
Premier of Alberta – Arthur Sifton   
Premier of British Columbia – Richard McBride (until December 15) then William John Bowser  
Premier of Manitoba – Rodmond Roblin (until May 12) then Tobias Norris  
Premier of New Brunswick – George Johnson Clarke 
Premier of Nova Scotia – George Henry Murray 
Premier of Ontario – William Hearst   
Premier of Prince Edward Island – John Alexander Mathieson  
Premier of Quebec – Lomer Gouin  
Premier of Saskatchewan – Thomas Walter Scott

Territorial governments

Commissioners 
 Commissioner of Yukon – George Black 
 Gold Commissioner of Yukon – George P. MacKenzie 
 Commissioner of Northwest Territories – Frederick D. White

Events
January 4 – WWI: Princess Patricia's Canadian Light Infantry becomes the first Canadian troops sent to the front lines
January 15 – The Canadian Northern Railway line to Vancouver, British Columbia, is completed
February 2 – WW1: Attempt to bomb the Vanceboro international bridge between the Canadian-US border by a German spy
February 4 – WW1: After a training accident, Lieutenant W. F. Sharpe becomes the first Canadian military airman killed
February 14 – WW1: The 1st Canadian Division arrives in France
February 21 – Nellie McClung presents a petition to the Alberta Legislature demanding women's suffrage
February 28 – WWI: Canadian troops launch the first trench raid of the war; by the end of the conflict Canadian troops will be regarded as the experts at this manoeuvre
April 22 – WWI: In the Second Battle of Ypres Canadian forces bear the brunt of the first large-scale chemical weapons attack on the Western Front.  They devise makeshift gas masks of urine-soaked rags and hold their ground
May 3 – "In Flanders Fields" is written by Canadian poet John McCrae.
May 12 – Tobias Norris becomes premier of Manitoba, replacing Sir Rodmond Roblin
July 5 – The Hotel Macdonald in Edmonton opens
August 6 – Manitoba General Election
September 13 – WWI: with the arrival of the 2nd Canadian Division a separate Canadian Corps is created
October 9 – WWI: The 3rd Canadian Division arrives in France
December 15 – William John Bowser becomes premier of British Columbia, replacing Richard McBride
December 19 – WW1: Captain M.M. Bell-Irving, No.1 Squadron, Royal Flying Corps, achieves the first aerial victory by a Canadian when he shot down a German aircraft

Full date unknown 
Fermière Monument (Montreal) unveiled
World War I – Many Canadian soldiers grow upset at the inferior quality of their Ross Rifles

Arts and literature

New works
"In Flanders Fields": John McCrae
The Golden Road: Lucy Maud Montgomery

Sport
March 26 – The Pacific Coast Hockey Association's Vancouver Millionaires win their First and only Stanley Cup by defeating the National Hockey Association's Ottawa Senators 3 games to 0. All games played at Vancouver's Denman Arena
November 20 – Hamilton Tigers win their 2nd Grey Cup by defeating the Toronto Rugby and Athletic Association 13 to 7 in the 7th Grey Cup played at Toronto's Varsity Stadium

Births

January to June
 January 12 – Joseph-Aurèle Plourde, Roman Catholic prelate, Archbishop of Ottawa (19671989) (d.2013)
January 18 – Syl Apps, pole vaulter and ice hockey player (d.1998)

February 12 – Lorne Greene, actor (d.1987)
March 10 – Maurice Camyré, Olympic boxer (d.2013)
March 18 – Harold Crowchild, Tsuu T'ina elder and soldier, last Treaty 7 World War II veteran (d.2013)
April 9 – Daniel Johnson, Sr., politician and 20th Premier of Quebec (d.1968)
April 11 – Eddie Sargent, politician (d.1998)
April 28 – Robina Higgins, track and field athlete (d.1990)
May 3 – Stu Hart, wrestler, promoter and trainer (d.2003)
May 28 
 Conrad Bourcier, ice hockey player (d.1987)
 Frank Pickersgill, World War II hero (d.1944)
June 22 – Arthur Gelber, philanthropist (d.1998)

July to December
July 4 – Harold E. Johns, medical physicist (d.1998)
July 6 – Leonard Birchall, World War II hero (d.2004)
August 3 – Frank Arthur Calder, politician, first Status Indian to be elected to any legislature in Canada (d.2006)
August 20 – H. Gordon Barrett, politician (d.1993)
August 22 
 James Hillier, scientist and inventor, jointly designed and built first electron microscope (d.2007)
 Jacques Flynn, politician and Senator (d.2000)
August 25 – John Bassett, publisher and media baron (d.1998)
October 7
 Harry J. Boyle, broadcaster and writer (d.2005)
 Charles Templeton, cartoonist, evangelist, agnostic, politician, newspaper editor, inventor, broadcaster and author (d.2001)
October 25 – Tommy Prince, one of Canada's most decorated First Nations soldiers (d.1977)
November 27 – Yves Thériault, author (d.1983)
December 4 – Johnny Lombardi, CHIN-TV television personality (d.2002)
December 13 – Ross Macdonald, novelist (d.1983)

Full date unknown
Arthur Julian Andrew, diplomat and author (d.1994)
Earl Cameron, broadcaster and news anchor (d.2005)
Percy Saltzman, meteorologist and television personality, first weatherman in English-Canadian television history (d.2007)

Deaths

January 18 – Thomas Bain, politician and Speaker of the House of Commons of Canada (b. 1834)

May 16 – Kit Coleman, journalist (b. 1864)
June 14 – Antoine Audet, politician (b. 1846)
 July 21 – Jean Prévost, politician (b. 1870)
July 22 – Sandford Fleming, engineer and inventor (b. 1827)
August 10 – William Mortimer Clark, lawyer, politician and Lieutenant Governor of Ontario (b. 1836)
September 10 – Charles Boucher de Boucherville, politician and 3rd Premier of Quebec (b. 1822)
September 11 – William Cornelius Van Horne, pioneering railway executive (b. 1843)
September 15 – Ernest Gagnon, folklorist (b. 1834)
October 19 – Neil McLeod, lawyer, judge, politician and Premier of Prince Edward Island (b. 1842)
October 30 – Charles Tupper, politician, Premier of Nova Scotia and 6th Prime Minister of Canada (b. 1821)
December 25 – Graham Fraser (industrialist) (b. 1845)

See also
 List of Canadian films

Historical documents
"Canada First" - Henri Bourassa warns against involvement in war beyond what is good for Canada's finances, agriculture, industry, trade, military etc.

Tests for tradesmen in Royal Flying Corps include coppersmiths making T pieces out of plate, tinsmiths making square funnels and painters signwriting

Canadian Lt. Col. John McCrae's poem "In Flanders Fields" is published in Punch magazine

Nursing sister Capt. Sophie Hoerner notes her hard work and praises her patients

Canadian prisoners of war tell German captors why they're fighting against Germany

Future minister of national defence George Pearkes describes trench duty conditions

Canadian soldier feels homicidal after friend's brother found dead on battlefield and their family perhaps lost in Lusitania sinking

Brant County, Ont. leaders thank Six Nations following death of Lt. Cameron Brant

Officer describes huge training camp at Valcartier, Quebec

Soldier's letter about visiting friends and touring palaces in England, then getting arrested for returning late to camp

Canada's hundreds of growing towns should deter growth of slums found in its big cities

Saskatchewan government revokes liquor licences

Indian residential school principal criticized for allowing children to go home too often

Postcard: "Salmon Fishing on the Fraser River" shows cannery interior with piles of hundreds of cans

References 

 
Years of the 20th century in Canada
Canada
Canada